JSC Concern VKO "Almaz-Antey" is a Russian state-owned company in the arms industry, a result of a merger of Antey Corporation and NPO Almaz, unifying some of the national military enterprises, in particular, the developers of anti-aircraft defence systems. The organisation is headquartered in Moscow and is the world's eighth-largest defence contractor measured by 2017 defence revenues. In 2017, Almaz-Antey had arms sales of $9.125 billion.

The Almaz-Antey group produce air defense systems, firearms for aircraft and armored vehicles, artillery shells and surface-to-surface missiles, airspace surveillance and coordination and artillery radars. The Group also manufacture civilian products such as navigation systems, air traffic systems, civil airtraffic- and weather radars, sewage cleaning systems, ventilation valves for nuclear power plants, and plastic packaging for cosmetics and food products.

History
Almaz-Antey was founded in 2002 by Presidential Decree 412 of the Russian President.

In 2003 the Director General of Almaz-Antey, Igor Klimov was shot dead. A criminal investigation found his death was linked to a property audit inside the company.

The current Board is headed by Viktor Ivanov, Director General; Vladislav Menshikov, Chief Designer; and Anatoly Savin.

In February 2015 the President of Russia signed a Decree to rename JSC Concern PVO "Almaz-Antey" to Concern VKO "Almaz-Antey", and to increase its capitalization. 'PVO' means Protivo-Vozdushnaya Oborona - air defence forces, the Russian name for the Soviet Air Defence Forces branch of the Soviet and Russian military. 'VKO' (or BKO), the Russian Aerospace Defence Forces, was the branch of the Armed Forces of the Russian Federation responsible for air and missile defence, and the operation of Russian military satellites and the Plesetsk Cosmodrome. In August 2015, the Russian Aerospace Forces was created, and includes both the Air Force, and the Aerospace Defence Forces.

Sanctions 
On 16 July 2014, the Obama administration imposed sanctions through the US Department of Treasury's Office of Foreign Assets Control (OFAC) by adding Almaz-Antey Concern and other entities to the Sectoral Sanctions Identifications List (SSI) in retaliation for the ongoing Ukrainian crisis, annexation of the Crimean Peninsula by the Kremlin, and the Russian interference in Ukraine.

In March 2022, as a result of the 2022 Russian invasion of Ukraine the EU imposed sanctions on Almaz-Antey Corporation.

Structure
Companies of the holding as of September 2014:

 Moscow Machine Building Plant "Avangard", Moscow
 Avitek, Kirov
 , Zhukovsky, Moscow Oblast
 NPO Almaz, Moscow
 Vektor State Enterprise, Ekaterinburg
 The Order of the Red Labor Banner All-Research institute Radio equipment, St. Petersburg, Vasilievsky Island
 All-Russian Scientific Research Institute of Radio Engineering, Moscow
 Volzhsky Electromechanical Factory, Republic of Mari El, Volzhsk
 , Vladivostok
 Obukhov State Plant, St. Petersburg
 The head center of the service Maintenance and repair of the Concern Air defense "Almaz-Antey" "Granite", Moscow
 Dolgoprudnenskoe Scientific Production Plant, Moscow region, Dolgoprudny
 Plant radio engineering Equipment, St. Petersburg
 Design Bureau of Special Machine-Building, St. Petersburg
 , Ryazan
 Design Bureau Kuntsevo, Moscow
 Izhevsk Electromechanical Plant, Izhevsk
 , Moscow
 , Republic of Mari El, Yoshkar-Ola
 , Vladimir region, Murom
 NIIIP, Novosibirsk
 Tikhomirov Scientific Research Institute of Instrument Design, Moscow Region, Zhukovsky
 Nizhny Novgorod Machine-Building Plant, Nizhny Novgorod
 NPO Novator, Ekaterinburg
 Scientific and production Association Pravdinsky Radio factory, Nizhny Novgorod region, Balakhna
 Pravdinskoye Design Bureau, Nizhny Novgorod region, Balakhna
 , Moscow region, Serpukhov
 , Ryazan
 Kazan experimental Design Bureau Soyuz, Kazan
 Scientific and production Association "Arrow", Tula
 Ulyanovsk Mechanical Plant, Ulyanovsk
 MKB Fakel, Moscow Region, Khimki
 Limited company Responsibility of Almaz-Antey- Story, Moscow
 Limited company Responsibility of Kantey, Moscow
 Almaz-Antey Telecommunications, Moscow
 Almaz-Antey Management consulting, Moscow
 Public corporation "Pulse", Moscow
 Public corporation Radiophysics, Moscow
 Public corporation "Lanthanum", Moscow
 Interstate joint-stock company Corporation Vympel, Moscow
 , St. Petersburg
 Arzamas Instrument-Building Plant, Nizhny Novgorod region, Arzamas
 Public corporation "Saturn", Omsk
 Kalinin Machine-Building Plant, Yekaterinburg
 , Ulyanovsk
 State Scientific- Research institute Instrument engineering, Moscow
 Nizhny Novgorod Research Institute of Radio Engineering, Nizhny Novgorod
 Scientific and Technical Center Industrial technologies and Air navigation systems, Moscow
 Special Design Bureau "Bearing", Ekaterinburg
 Khabarovsk radio engineering factory, Khabarovsk
 1015 factory for repair of military- Technical property, Sverdlovsk Region, Nizhny Sergi
 Manufacturing enterprise «Radar-2633», Moscow Region, Lyubertsy
 502 factory for repair of military- Technical property, Noginsk, Moscow region
 69 repair plant for rocket- Artillery armament, Kaliningrad
 1019 military repair plant, Republic of Buryatia, Zaigraevsky district, Onohoy
 1253 central repair base Radar weapons, Samara
 3821 factory for repair of military, Leningrad Region, Tosno
 Repair plant for radio electronic Technique «LUCH», Leningrad Region, Vsevolozhsky district, Village Yanino
 Nizhny Novgorod Plant of the 70th Anniversary Victory, Nizhny Novgorod

See also
 Rosoboronexport
 Rostec
 Sozvezdie
 Titan-Barrikady
 Uralvagonzavod

References

External links
  
 https://web.archive.org/web/20070929121309/http://ftp.fas.org/irp/world/russia/fbis/MissileIndustry.html

 
Defence companies of Russia
Companies established in 2002
Companies based in Moscow
2002 establishments in Russia
Government-owned companies of Russia
Holding companies of Russia
Russian entities subject to the U.S. Department of the Treasury sanctions